The castra of Hinova was a Late Roman fort built north of the Lower Danube in the 3rd or 4th century AD.
The fort was destroyed for the first time between 378 - 379 AD. In the beginning of 5th century the fort was destroyed by Huns and finally abandoned by Romans.

See also
List of castra

References

Notes

External links
Castrul roman Hinova
Roman castra from Romania - Google Maps / Earth

Roman legionary fortresses in Romania
History of Oltenia
Historic monuments in Mehedinți County